Wilmer "Rufe" Waters (October 4, 1914 – December 10, 1995) was a member of the Wisconsin State Assembly.

Biography
Waters was born in West Plains, Missouri. He attended Elk Mound High School in Elk Mound, Wisconsin before attending the University of Wisconsin-Eau Claire, the University of Hawaii at Manoa, and the University of Wisconsin-Madison. During World War II, he served in the United States Navy.

Political career
Waters was elected to the Assembly in 1966. He was defeated in his 1968 reelection bid by Joseph Looby, initially losing by a single vote, and after review by the circuit court, the judge declared the margin was two votes. In addition, Waters was president of the Eau Claire, Wisconsin City Council. He was a Republican.

References

People from West Plains, Missouri
People from Elk Mound, Wisconsin
Politicians from Eau Claire, Wisconsin
Republican Party members of the Wisconsin State Assembly
Wisconsin city council members
Military personnel from Wisconsin
United States Navy sailors
United States Navy personnel of World War II
University of Wisconsin–Eau Claire alumni
University of Hawaiʻi at Mānoa alumni
University of Wisconsin–Madison alumni
1914 births
1995 deaths
20th-century American politicians